The 2012 Marshall Thundering Herd football team represented Marshall University in the 2012 NCAA Division I FBS football season. They were led by third-year head coach Doc Holliday and played their home games at Joan C. Edwards Stadium. They are a member of the East Division of Conference USA. They finished the season 5–7, 4–4 in C-USA play to finish in a tie for third place in the East Division.

Schedule

Game summaries

West Virginia

Marshall and West Virginia last met in 2011 at Morgantown in a game won by WVU 34–13. Marshall is 0–12 all time against West Virginia.

Western Carolina

Marshall and Western Carolina last met in 1996 at Huntington in a game won by Marshall 56-21. Marshall is 9-9-2 all time against Western Carolina

Ohio

Marshall and Ohio last met in 2011 at Athens in a game won by Ohio 44-7. Marshall is 19-30-6 all time against Ohio.

Rice

Marshall and Rice last met in 2011 at Huntington in a game won by Marshall 24-20. Marshall is 2-1 all time against Rice

Purdue

Marshall and Purdue will meet for the first time in school history.

Tulsa

Marshall and Tulsa last met in 2011 at Tulsa in a game won by Tulsa 59–17. Marshall is 0–3 all time against Tulsa. This year's game will be Homecoming.

Southern Miss

Marshall and Southern Miss last met in 2011 at Huntington in a game won by Marshall 26-20. Marshall is 2-5 all time against Southern Miss.

Central Florida

Marshall and Central Florida last met in 2011 at Orlando in a game won by UCF 16–6. Marshall is 3–7 all time against UCF.

Memphis

Marshall and Memphis last met in 2011 at Memphis in a game won by Marshall 23–22. Marshall is 5–2 all time against Memphis.

UAB

Marshall and UAB last met in 2011 at Huntington in a game won by Marshall 59-14. Marshall is 6-1 all time against UAB.

Houston

Marshall and Houston last met in 2011 at Houston in a game won by Houston 63-28. Marshall is 2-2 all time against Houston

East Carolina

Marshall and East Carolina last met in 2011 at Huntington in a game won by Marshall 34–27 in overtime. Marshall is 4–9 all time against ECU. This year's game will be on a Friday.

References

Marshall
Marshall Thundering Herd football seasons
Marshall Thundering Herd football